Tsvetan Veselinov (27 April 1947 in Sofia – 26 February 2018) was a Bulgarian footballer who played as a midfielder. He spent all 10 seasons of his career in the A Group with Levski Sofia, before retiring at the age of 28 in 1975. 

With the Bulgarian national team he won a silver medal at the 1968 Summer Olympics. Veselinov netted Bulgaria's only goal in the final against Hungary, a 4–1 defeat at Estadio Azteca on 26 October 1968.

His death was announced on 26 February 2018. He was 70.

Honours

Club
Levski Sofia
Bulgarian A Group (3): 1967–68, 1969–70, 1973–74
Bulgarian Cup (3): 1967, 1970, 1971

See also
 List of one-club men in association football

References

External links
 Player Profile at LevskiSofia.info

1947 births
2018 deaths
Bulgarian footballers
Bulgaria international footballers
Association football midfielders
PFC Levski Sofia players
First Professional Football League (Bulgaria) players
Footballers from Sofia
Olympic footballers of Bulgaria
Footballers at the 1968 Summer Olympics
Olympic silver medalists for Bulgaria
Olympic medalists in football
Medalists at the 1968 Summer Olympics